Sport has a very significant role in South African culture. The three most popular mainstream sports in the country — soccer, rugby, and cricket — reflect the country's early British colonial influence. South Africa was absent from international sport for most of the apartheid era due to sanctions, but started competing globally after the end of apartheid. South Africa is among a very few countries which have participated in world cups of all four major sports — cricket, Soccer, rugby union and rugby league. England, Ireland, Scotland, New Zealand, and Australia are among other such nations. South Africa has hosted the 1995 Rugby World Cup, 2003 ICC Cricket World Cup and 2007 ICC World Twenty20, and 2010 FIFA World Cup.

History

South Africa was banned from the 1964 Summer Olympics in Tokyo due to the apartheid policies. This ban effectively lasted until 1992. During this time, some sports people (like Zola Budd and Kepler Wessels) left for other countries in order to compete internationally. Some athletes continued their sports careers in South Africa in isolation, with some stars like women's 400 metres runner Myrtle Bothma running a world record time at the South African championships.

Some sports teams toured South Africa as "Rebel Tours" and played the Springbok rugby and cricket teams in South Africa during the isolation period.

In 1977, Commonwealth Presidents and Prime Ministers agreed, as part of their support for the international campaign against apartheid, to discourage contact and competition between their sportsmen and sporting organisations, teams or individuals from South Africa.

Regulation
The National Sport and Recreation Act (1998) provides for the promotion and development of sport in South Africa, and coordinates relationships between the Sports Commission, sports federations and related agencies. It aims to correct imbalances in sport by promoting equity and democracy, and provides for dispute resolution mechanisms. It empowers the Minister to make regulations, and allows the Sports Commission (and NOCSA in respect of the Olympic Games) to co-ordinate, promote and develop sport in South Africa. Membership of the Sports Commission is open to a wide range of sports bodies, as long as these meet the criteria set by the commission. Sports bodies that permit forms of discrimination based on gender, race, disability, religion or creed, are for instance not allowed.

A draft amendment bill (December 2019) proposed by the Department of Sports, Arts and Culture aims to strengthen the minister's regulatory control over sports codes (at local, provincial or national levels), besides clubs and fitness organisations. If accepted, a Sport Arbitration Tribunal will be created. The tribunal will determine the delegation of sporting powers and will be tasked with disputes arising between different sports bodies. It will also regulate the fitness industry (registration and certification), set up procedures in bidding for and hosting of international sports events, regulate combat sport, and decide on offences and penalties (including jail sentences). Sports bodies would not operate independently anymore, but would promote their sports in consultation with the minister.

The role of sport in the formation of a South African identity, post-Apartheid
Association football has historically been particularly popular amongst persons of African descent, although it does have a strong following amongst white South Africans as well and is South Africa's most popular sport overall. South Africa also hosted the 2010 FIFA World Cup.

The South Africa national rugby union team, which is nicknamed Springboks or the Bokke, are currently ranked no. 3 in the world in Rugby union, and have had multiple successful international and world cup campaigns. Rugby union used to be the most popular sport in South Africa amongst white South Africans traditionally, but not anymore. Today, it is a sport that is played and enjoyed amongst all races in South Africa. South Africa hosted the 1995 Rugby World Cup, the first one hosted in Africa, going on to win it as well.

Cricket is traditionally the popular sport among the white British diaspora and Indian South African communities, although it is now followed by members of all races in the country. The national cricket team is nicknamed The Proteas. South Africa hosted the 2003 ICC Cricket World Cup and 2007 ICC World Twenty20.

Other popular sports include: athletics, basketball, boxing, golf, netball, softball, field hockey, swimming, surfing and tennis.

Women's sport
Sport in South Africa is still largely seen (in the words of a former member of Women and Sport South Africa) as "the domain of men". In 1997, one writer described "massive gender inequalities in the sporting structures of the country, and a strong association between sport and masculinity".

National teams and names
South Africa's national sporting colours are green, gold and white. The protea is the national emblem worn by South Africans representing their country in sport.

The national rugby union teams are nicknamed the "Springboks", while the national cricket teams are known as the "Proteas".

Elite level team sports

Rugby

Rugby union

Rugby union is the most popular team sport in South Africa. The national team is known as the Springboks. South Africa hosted and won the 1995 Rugby World Cup, in what was their first appearance. The defeat of the All Blacks in the final is remembered as one of the most famous South African sporting moments. The domestic league – the Currie Cup – is also played annually. From 1996 South Africa fielded sides against teams from Australia and New Zealand in the Super Rugby competition. This was expanded to include teams from Argentina and Japan but, after the COVID-19 pandemic forced the competition to split into three, South Africa left and joined the United Rugby Championship facing teams from Ireland, Scotland, Wales and Italy. This new alignment to the Northern Hemisphere led to South Africa's inclusion in the European Rugby Champions Cup from 2022.

After being tainted by associations with apartheid, the Springboks (or 'Boks') have sought to become part of the 'New South Africa', with President Nelson Mandela wearing the Springbok jersey, once only worn by white South Africans, at the final of the 1995 Rugby World Cup.

South Africa has won the Rugby World Cup three times, in 1995, 2007 and 2019, the only other country in the world to do so along with New Zealand.

Rugby league

Rugby league is popular, although to a much lesser extent than rugby union. The national team, nicknamed the Rhinos, have enjoyed moderate success since their first international matches in the 1960s, reaching the World Cup in 1995 and 2000 and were among the premier nations in the sport in the 1990s and early 2000s. They are ranked 25th in the world. Rugby league (XIII) is a more recently growing spectator sport in South Africa in current years, but it has struggled to gain a foothold in the country due to the popularity of sports such as soccer, rugby union and cricket, and also due to their location, meaning a lack of meaningful international matches.

The South Africa national rugby league team (Rhinos) is ranked 25th in the world out of 51 countries ranked and doesn't manage to enjoy the success or media attention that most other sports receive.  The national team dates back to the early 60's and have featured in 2 World Cups, the 1995 Rugby League World Cup and the 2000 Rugby League World Cup.

South African players who have played professionally in Australasia's NRL and the Super League include Tom Van Vollenhoven (St Helens R.F.C.), Jamie Bloem (Castleford Tigers, Huddersfield Giants and Halifax) and Jarrod Saffy (Wests Tigers and St. George Illawarra Dragons).

There are currently three competitions, the top-level Rhino Cup consisting of 8 teams, the Protea Cup, consisting of 4 and the Western Province Rugby League, consisting of 5.

Rugby sevens
The South Africa national rugby sevens team (known as the Blitzbokke) compete in the World Rugby Sevens Series, the Rugby World Cup Sevens, the Summer Olympic Games and the Commonwealth Games. They won the bronze medal in the 2016 Olympic Games, and silver in the 1997 Rugby World Cup Sevens. They have won the Commonwealth Games tournament twice in 2014 and 2022. South Africa have also won the Sevens World Series four times. The South Africa Sevens is an annual tournament held in Cape Town as the South African leg of the Sevens World Series.

Soccer

Football is the most popular sport for many Black South Africans.

South Africa hosted the 2010 FIFA World Cup and became the first African side to do so.

Bafana Bafana as hosts of the 2010 FIFA World Cup were drawn in Group A with Mexico, Uruguay and France, they played their first match against Mexico which ended in a 11 draw in Johannesburg. They played their second match against Uruguay and the match ended in a 30 defeat in Pretoria, their last match was against France in Bloemfontein which South Africa needed more goals to advance to the knockout stages but the match ended in a 21 win that was not enough for them to progress to the knockout stages, thereby becoming the first host nation to exit at the group stage in history of World Cup. After the world cup the team continues to struggle as they missed the 2014 and 2018 FIFA World Cups.

The team has made three appearances in the 1998, 2002 and 2010 FIFA World Cups and 10 appearances in the Africa Cup of Nations, they won in the final of 1996.

Orlando Pirates and Kaizer Chiefs are Soweto rivals, they play with Mamelodi Sundowns in the South African league system by playing at the DStv Premiership. The domestic cups are MTN 8, Telkom Knockout and Nedbank Cup while the international cups are CAF Champions League and CAF Confederation Cup. The sport governing body is SAFA.

Cricket

Cricket is one of the most popular team sports in South Africa. It is the only sport in South Africa to feature in the top two sports of all race groups. The national team is known as the Proteas.

South Africa is one of the leading cricket-playing nations in the world and one of the twelve countries sanctioned to play test cricket. Ever since the readmission into international cricket, the Proteas have been contributing largely to the development of the game mainly by bringing innovations in coaching and training. South Africa is famous for its batters, fast bowlers and fielders such as AB De Villiers, Dale Steyn and Jonty Rhodes.

Cricket was traditionally popular among English-speaking whites and the Asian (Subcontinent) community, though the latter were not able to compete in top-level South African cricket in the apartheid era. Since the end of the apartheid era, a higher proportion of white players have come from Afrikaans-speaking backgrounds, and attempts have been made to increase the number of non-white players, in part through a quota system. The current national team features prominent non-white players, such as Kagiso Rabada, Hashim Amla (the first Muslim to play for South Africa), Keshav Maharaj, Temba Bavuma, Vernon Philander, Lungi Ngidi, and Tabraiz Shamsi. Afrikaners in the team include Faf du Plessis, Rassie van der Dussen, Wiaan Mulder, and Heinrich Klaasen. Charl Langeveldt, a non-white player, also became the first South African to take a hat-trick in an ODI match in 2005. Kagiso Rabada became the third after JP Duminy, and currently boasts the best match figures by a South African, 6 for 16, in an ODI.

The team has had success with batsmen like Herschelle Gibbs, who was one of the sport's most dominating batsmen, all-rounders like Jacques Kallis and Shaun Pollock, the former being one of the greatest all rounders of the game, and bowlers such as Makhaya Ntini, who reached number two in the ICC Player Rankings in 2006. Dale Steyn is currently ranked as one of the best test bowlers, and former captain Graeme Smith was one of the most dominant left-handed batsmen in recent world cricket history. Wicketkeeper Mark Boucher has the world record for the most dismissals for a wicketkeeper in Tests. Kevin Pietersen, who is white, left the country claiming that he was put at a disadvantage by positive discrimination, and within a few years became one of the world's top batsmen, playing for England. South Africa is one of the strongest teams and in 2006, in Johannesburg in what was the highest scoring 50 over ODI ever, South Africa led by Gibbs' 175 chased down Australia's mammoth and then world record score of 434–4. South Africa hosted the 2003 Cricket World Cup an event that was disappointing to them as they tied against Sri Lanka in what happened to be in a farcical situation and were eliminated on home soil. In the 2007 Cricket World Cup, South Africa reached the semi-finals of the event but lost to Australia. They were sent home by New Zealand in the 2011 Cricket World Cup and the same team also defeated them in the 2015 Cricket World Cup in a thrilling semi-final.

South Africans are at the top and are a consistent team in the test format for the last half decade. They are often considered as fearsome for the teams touring from the Indian subcontinent because of their brutal fast bowling. Cricketer Tabraiz Shamsi is the no. 1 ranked T20 cricket bowler in the world.

Hockey
Major events: Hockey Africa Cup of Nations, Hockey World Cup and Women's Hockey World Cup

Hockey in South Africa has been played for decades, mainly by the white minority. Like most other sports, South Africa was banned from international Hockey from 1964 onwards. In August 1992, the South African Hockey Association was formed, with the aims of "Creat[ing] opportunities for participation without distinction based on colour, race, creed, religion or gender" and to "Redress historical disparities to allow all to participate and compete equally and specifically address the needs of historically disadvantaged communities through special programmes." As a result, South Africa was allowed to take part in international competitions from 1993 onwards, including the Hockey Africa Cup of Nations, a trophy that has been won every time since by both the South African Men's Hockey team and the South African Women's Hockey team.

On the national level, the major competition within South Africa is the Premier Hockey league. This consists of two leagues (one men, one women) each of six teams. The men's teams are the Addo Elephants, Drakensberg Dragons, Garden Route Gazelles, Golden Gate Gladiators, Mapungubwe Mambas and the Maropeng Cavemen. The women's teams are the Blyde River Bunters, Madikwe Rangers, Namaqualand Daisies, Orange River Rafters, St Lucia Lakers and the Wineland Wings. The Golden Gate Gladiators and the Namaqualand Daisies are the South African national U21 teams for men and women respectively. The teams played each other on a round robin tournament and the bottom two teams are eliminated (and then play each other to determine 5th and 6th place.) The top four teams play in two semi-finals, the 1st against the 3rd and the 2nd against the 4th. The winners of each semi-final then play each other in the final (and the losers play each other for 3rd and 4th place.) The league usually plays over four weekends from late November to mid December.

On the World Stage, the men's team has qualified for the Olympics four times, highest placing 10th (2004). They've also qualified for the Hockey World Cup six times, highest placing 10th (2010). The women's team has qualified for the Olympics four times, highest placing 9th (2004), and the Women's Hockey World Cup six times, highest placing 7th (1998).

South Africa's Men's and Women's teams are currently rated 12th and 16th, respectively, in the FIH World Rankings. Both teams are members of the African Hockey Federation, the governing body for Hockey in Africa, and the International Hockey Federation.

Other team sports

Australian rules football 

Australian rules football is a minor sport in South Africa. Since 1996 the sport has been growing quickly. South Africa has a national team the South African national Australian rules football team. The team in 2007 competed against Australia's best Under 17 players, as well as defeating a touring Australian amateur senior team for the first time. There are annual national championships, first held in 2008. The South African national team also competes in the Australian Football International Cup, essentially a World Cup for all countries apart from Australia, the only place where the sport is played professionally. The South African national team's highest finish at the International Cup was third, in 2008.

Basketball

Basketball is an increasingly popular sport in South Africa, especially amongst the youth. The national federation Basketball South Africa was founded in 1992 and is one of the youngest members of the global basketball governing body FIBA. The national team competes at the FIBA Africa Championship.

So far, no basketball player of South African nationality has made it to the NBA. However, South Africa was the birthplace to Steve Nash, two-time MVP in the NBA, and Swiss NBA player Thabo Sefolosha has a South African father.

Beach volleyball 
South Africa featured a men's national team in beach volleyball that competed at the 2018–2020 CAVB Beach Volleyball Continental Cup.

Korfball 
The Dutch sport of korfball is administered by the South African Korfball Federation, who manage the South Africa national korfball team. The 2019 IKF World Korfball Championship was held in August 2019 in Durban, South Africa.

Lacrosse 
In April 2021, South Africa became the 69th member of the rapidly growing international federation for lacrosse. South Africa became the fourth African country to do so.
In 2007, a group of volunteers established the South African Lacrosse Project (SALP), which introduced thousands of young people to lacrosse, particularly in smaller villages in the Limpopo Province north of Johannesburg that lack the same sport offerings of many major cities.

Elite level individual sports

Athletics (track and field)
Major events: Comrades Marathon and Two Oceans Marathon

South Africa has an active athletics schedule and has produced a number of athletes who compete internationally and qualify for the Olympic and Paralympic Games. At the 2011 World Championships in Athletics in Daegu, South Korea, the relay team of Shane Victor, Ofentse Mogawane, Willem de Beer and Oscar Pistorius set a national record time of 2:59.21 seconds in the heats. South Africa went on to win a silver medal in the finals with the team of Victor, Mogawane, de Beer and L. J. van Zyl.

In 2012 Caster Semenya won a gold medal in the women's 800m of the 2012 Olympic Games in London, with a time of 1:57.23 seconds. Also in 2012, Oscar Pistorius became the first double amputee sprinter to compete at the Olympic Games, but did not win a medal.

Pistorius won a gold medal and a bronze medal in the T44 class at the 2004 Summer Paralympics in Athens, and three gold medals at the 2008 Summer Paralympic Games in Beijing. He also won two gold medals at the 2012 Paralympic Games and remained the T43 world record holder for the 200 and 400 metres events. The South African team of Pistorius, Arnu Fourie, Zivan Smith and Samkelo Radebe won a gold medal and set a Paralympic record in the 4 × 100 m relay with a time of 41.78 seconds. Fourie also set a world record in the heats of the T44 200m event and won a bronze medal in the 100m event.

Boxing 

As of March 2012 when Jeffrey Mathebula won the IBF junior featherweight title, South Africa has produced a large seventy-one world champions since Willie Smith won the British version of the world bantamweight title. In addition to the universally recognised world champion Vic Toweel, the number contains champions recognised by the major and nonmajor sanctioning bodies, and seventy-one world champions have won one hundred and fourteen titles including thirty-five titles for the four major sanctioning bodies (WBA, WBC, IBF and WBO). South Africa had eight world champions in 1998.

However, according to Jeffrey Mathebula's trainer Nick Durandt who has trained world champions such as Thulani Malinga and Phillip N'dou in his 25-year career, South Africa had not been able to host the world title bouts due to lack of funds, and boxers had been forced to fight overseas for world titles. The Gauteng sports department has been cooperative, but sponsorship and television coverage significantly dropped in thirty years. Boxing matches had not been broadcast on the state-owned broadcaster SABC from early 2011, and only a few cards had been aired on the satellite pay-TV platform SuperSport. Durandt had also mentioned that it is almost impossible to hold fights including world title bouts without SABC's support in their own country. Under such background, as a result of the efforts of Branco Sports Promotions' Branco Milenkovic and others, it was decided that the IBF junior featherweight title bout between Takalani Ndlovu and Mathebula would be televised on SABC at the last minute. "We support the muted multi-lateral agreement involving the South African Broadcasting Corporation (SABC), SuperSport and the BSA  on broadcasting rights," Sports Minister Fikile Mbalula stated in March 2013. However, after Simpiwe Vetyeka won the world title in December of that year, Bongani Mwelase told that Vetyeka came home to receive an "ice-cold welcome" from the local newspapers and so on but with the only exception of Nelson Mandela. "Nothing is motivating if you really look at how boxing is treated here," he said.

Cycling
Major events: Cape Argus Cycle Race and 94.7 Cycle Challenge

South Africa has a strong cycle race scene. The most notable cyclist is Robert Hunter who won a stage in the 2007 Tour de France. Robert Hunter rode that tour with Team Barloworld who had gained a wildcard entry to the Tour de France that year. Barloworld were a UK-registered team with a management team consisting mainly of Italians with a South African sponsor, and had several African riders. In 2015 it was announced that the South African MTN-Qhubeka squad would become the first African-registered team to compete at the Tour. The team made an impact at the tour, with Daniel Teklehaimanot spending several days in the polka dot jersey and Steve Cummings winning the fourteenth stage of the race on Mandela Day. In the 2016 Tour de France the team won five stages through Cummings and Mark Cavendish, the latter also wearing the yellow jersey.

Cycling South Africa or CyclingSA is the national governing body of cycling in South Africa.

Another South African, Greg Minnaar, is a 4-time downhill mountain bike world champion in 2003, 2012, 2013 and 2021, with his win in 2021 making him the oldest ever world champion in downhill history at the age of 39. 2 On top of this he has 4 second places and 3 third places in the world championships.

At the 2013 Tour de France, Daryl Impey became the first African cyclist to wear the yellow jersey as race leader, which he held for two stages. Louis Meintjes took the best overall result for an African rider at a Grand Tour when he finished 10th at the 2015 Vuelta a España, before he finished in the top 10 in the 2016 Tour de France, another first for an African rider.

Horseriding
South Africa hosts the Saddle Seat World Cup every four years, which includes the American Saddlebred, Morgan horse, and South African Boerperd horse breeds. It is the highest level of competition for Saddle seat Equitation riders.

Golf
Golf in South Africa has a long and illustrious history, and South Africa is one of the major golfing nations.

The first South African to win a major championship was Bobby Locke who won The British Open four times in 1949, 1950, 1952 and 1957. Also, he claimed nine wins at the South African Open, seven at the South Africa Professional and 11 at the Transvaal Open, for a total 74 professional wins.

The most famous of South African golfers is however Gary Player who along with Arnold Palmer and Jack Nicklaus dominated world golf for much of the 1960s, and 1970s. Player won all four majors, winning the British Open in 1959, 1968 and 1974, The Masters in 1961, 1974 and 1978, the PGA Championship in 1962 and 1972 and the U.S Open just once in 1965. Player always played in his trademark black outfits and became one of the recognisable figures in the sport. He also enjoyed considerable success in senior golf, winning six majors on the Champions Tour (then the Senior PGA Tour) from 1986 to 1990. The only other South African to have won a senior major is Simon Hobday, winner of the U.S. Senior Open in 1994.

Current players who have won majors are 1994, 1997 U.S. Open and 2002 British Open Champion Ernie Els, 2001 and 2004 U.S. Open Champion Retief Goosen, 2008 Masters Champion Trevor Immelman, British Open Champion Louis Oosthuizen and 2011 Masters Champion Charl Schwartzel. Other notable players include Tim Clark with two Nationwide Tour wins and winner of the PGA 2010 Players Championship.

The country has had less success in women's golf. The only South African woman to have won a major was Sally Little, who won the LPGA Championship in 1980. Little later became a U.S. citizen and won a second major, the 1988 du Maurier Classic, as an American.

The Sunshine Tour is based in South Africa but has a few events in other African countries. Several tournaments have been sanctioned by the European Tour since the 1990s:

 South African PGA Championship (1995–1999)
 FNB Players Championship (1996)
 Dimension Data Pro-Am (1996–1997)
 South African Open (1997–present)
 Alfred Dunhill Championship (1990–present)
 Joburg Open (2007–present)
 Africa Open (2010–present)
 Nelson Mandela Championship (2012–2013)
 Volvo Golf Champions (2012–2014)
 Tshwane Open (2013–present)
 Nedbank Golf Challenge (2013–present)

Also, the South African Women's Open was part of the Ladies European Tour from 2012 to 2014. South Africa has hosted the 2003 Presidents Cup and the Women's World Cup of Golf from 2005 to 2008.

Mixed martial arts 
South Africa host Extreme Fighting Championship (formerly known as EFC Africa). It is the number 1 mixed martial arts organisation in the African continent.

EFC Africa 01 took place at The Coca-Cola Dome in Northgate, Johannesburg on 10 November 2009 and is now viewing in 110 countries, including USA, Canada, The Caribbean and all over Europe. EFC Africa 19, which was held at Carnival City in Johannesburg on 19 April 2013, topped other African sports ratings with a record of over 1.8 million views with 31.3% of the total South African TV audience (SABC, e.tv and DStv combined). These are the biggest ratings in EFC history, topping EFC Africa 12's record of 1.6 million views and 25.9% audience share.

On 19 June 2004, Cape Town's Trevor Prangley made his UFC debut. He defeated Curtis Stout by submission via cobra choke in round 2 at UFC 48. His last fight in the UFC was against Chael Sonnen, who he defeated previously by arm bar submission in round 1 before they both started fighting in the UFC. Sonnen defeated him by unanimous decision at UFC Ultimate Fight Night 4. His record with the UFC was 2 wins and 2 losses.

United Kingdom based South African fighter Fraser Opie competed on The Ultimate Fighter: Team Jones vs. Team Sonnen, season 17 of the UFC's reality television show. He lost to Clint Hester in the preliminary round via unanimous decision. Fraser signed with EFC after competing on the show. He beat Egypt's Mohamad Ali via TKO in round 1 on his EFC debut at EFC 22, then lost to then-defending champion Gideon Drotshie for the EFC Light Heavyweight Title via TKO in round 2 at EFC 25 and then lost to Tumelo Maphutha via submission from punches in round 1 at EFC 27. Opie was set to fight Pete Motaung at EFC 34 but was removed from the card due to a dispute about travel arrangements according to Opie and was replaced by former opponent Tumelo Maphutha. While EFC seem to have refused a previously agreed direct flight for Fraser, the agreement appears to have fallen through with EFC only willing to provide indirect flights with a connecting flight that would increase the overall travel time which Opie suggested is simply not possible due to his demanding weight cut. In result, Fraser Opie was cut from EFC.

In February 2014, EFC Heavyweight Champion Ruan Potts signed with the UFC. He fought Soa Palelei at UFC Fight Night 40 at U.S. Bank Arena in Cincinnati, Ohio on 10 May 2014 on his UFC debut. He lost via first-round KO. His next fight was at UFC 177 Prelims on 30 August 2014 at The Sleep Train Arena in Sacramento, California against Anthony Hamilton. He lost in round 2 via TKO due to continuous body shots.

In December 2014, the UFC signed EFC Middleweight Champion Garreth McLellan. He made his debut on 11 April 2015 at UFC Fight Night: Gonzaga vs Cro Cop 2 in Krakow, Poland. He was originally scheduled to fight Poland's Krzysztof Jotko. Jotko pulled out of the fight. He fought another Polishman in Bartorsz Fabinski. He lost via unanimous decision (30-27, 30-27, 30-27). At UFC Fight Night: Holohan vs. Smolka in Dublin, Ireland on 24 October 2015, McLellan got his first UFC win which was against Bubba Bush. McLellan finished Bush with a second to go via TKO in round 3.

In January 2015, EFC President Cairo Howarth announced the opening of the EFC Women's Flyweight Division. The first EFC women's fight took place at EFC 37 on 21 February at Carnival City in Johannesburg. Johannesburg's own Danella Eliasov fought Hungary's Zita Varju. Eliasov won via TKO in round 1. Their first Women's Flyweight Champion was crowned at EFC 60 when Amanda Lino defeated Jaqualine Trosse in a rematch by armbar in round 2. The Inaugural title fight was meant to be between Amanda Lino and Shana Power at EFC 54 but Shana couldn't make weight and was not medically cleared to compete. Jaqualine Trosse and Shana Power fought at EFC 56. Trosse won the fight via unanimous decision and was given the fight against Lino for the vacant title at EFC 60 which she lost.

EFC Flyweight Champion, Nkazimulo Zulu competed The Ultimate Fighter: Tournament of Champions. The winner is set to fight Demetrious Johnson for the UFC Flyweight Championship. He fought Japan's Hiromasa Ogikubo in the first round on the tournament. He lost via submission due to a rear naked choke in round 2.

Motor sports

South Africa has staged the Formula One Grand Prix, the last being the 1993 race at the Kyalami circuit. It has produced the 1979 Formula One world champion, Jody Schekter, who triumphed for Ferrari that year. South Africa was also one of the host nations for the A1 Grand Prix.

Former Indycar Series driver and son of Jody, Tomas Scheckter, led the most laps in both his first two Indianapolis 500 starts. Which was 85 laps during the 2002 Indianapolis 500 and 63 laps during the 2003 Indianapolis 500. He has two career Indycar victories during his career. He has driven full-time for Cheever Racing in 2002, Chip Ganassi Racing in 2003, Panther Racing in 2004 and 2005 and Vision Racing in 2006 and 2007. He has also driven for Luczo Dragon Racing, Dreyer & Reinbold Racing and other teams part-time later in his career until 2011.

Motor rallying and off-road (4x4) racing are also widely popular and practiced in South Africa. The 2009 Dakar Rally was won by South African Giniel de Villiers in a Volkswagen Touareg.

Swimming 

 Major events: Midmar Mile
The aQuelle Ocean Racing Series is Africa's largest beach event with a 400m ocean swim, 1 km, 2 km, and 3 km Ocean Swims available on mostly alternate Sunday Morning's throughout Summer in Nelson Mandela Bay (Port Elizabeth) and hosted by local non-profit sports events company Zsports Events NPC.
The Nelson Mandela Bay River Mile (river mile) is Africa's oldest open water swimming event having started in 1924 and is hosted annually in Nelson Mandela Bay in mid-February.

Tennis 
South Africa had some occasional successes with tennis throughout the Apartheid era. It won the 1974 Davis Cup, albeit only by default as India refused to travel to South Africa to compete in the final, due to the apartheid regime. South Africa was banned from the competition in 1979, not to re-enter till 1995.

Johan Kriek won the Australian Open final in 1981 (South Africa's only Grand Slam victory to date), before becoming a US citizen in 1982. Kevin Curren reached the Australian Open final in 1984, losing to Mats Wilander, before naturalising as a US citizen in 1985. Other South African Grand Slam finalists include Brian Norton (1921), Irene Bowder Peacock (1927), Eric Sturgess (1947, 1948 & 1951), Ian Vermaak (1959), Sandra Reynolds (1960), Cliff Drysdale (1965) and Kevin Anderson (2017, 2018). The most recent tennis players who made it into the world top ten rankings are Wayne Ferreira, Amanda Coetzer and Kevin Anderson.

The South African Open was part of the Grand Prix from 1972 to 1989 and the ATP Tour from 1990 to 2011.

Other individual sports

Canoeing 
A number of large canoe events occur annually in South Africa:
 Dusi Canoe Marathon
 Fish River Canoe Marathon
 Berg River Canoe Marathon

Obstacle course racing
SA OCR is a not-for-profit company aiming to help grow the sport and provide a means of financial support for athletes wanting to travel to compete internationally. With the OCR World Championships running for 3 consecutive years now as well as some of the larger local race series like The Warrior Race which have been around for almost 4 years the sport is growing with events reaching almost 9000 participants on a weekend. The sport involves running, usually around 12 km, with various amounts of different obstacles interspersed.

Sailing
South African Sailing is the national governing body for the sport of sailing in South Africa, recognised by the International Sailing Federation.

Surfing 

Surfing is widely practiced around major coastal cities, such as Cape Town and Durban.

Triathlon 
In triathlon, Henri Schoeman is an Olympic bronze medallist, finishing third at the 2016 Summer Olympics in Rio. Conrad Stoltz is a three-time Xterra Triathlon world champion, Raynard Tissink is a multiple Ironman champion, Hendrick de Villiers is an ITU World Cup winner, Richard Murray is an ITU World Triathlon Series race winner and Dan Hugo is an Xterra and multi-sport star.
Port Elizabeth plays host to a half ironman distance event, the PEople's Triathlon (website),  in September each year and features a 2 km ocean swim, 90 km cycle and 21 km run.

Parasports
South Africa has a number of disabled athletes, most notably Oscar Pistorius, the double amputee world record holder at 200 and 400 metres; and swimmer Natalie du Toit, who became the first amputee to compete in swimming at the (able-bodied) Olympics in 2008.

Traditional sports
 Jukskei is a 200-year-old folk sport developed and played in South Africa.
 Morabaraba promoted by Mind Sports South Africa.

Major sports facilities

National stadiums

 FNB Stadium (South Africa national football team) in Johannesburg has a capacity of 94,736 and hosted the final of the 2010 FIFA World Cup.
 Ellis Park Stadium (South Africa national rugby team) in Johannesburg has a capacity of 62,567 and hosted the final of the 1995 Rugby World Cup.
 Wanderers Stadium (South Africa national cricket team) in Johannesburg has a capacity of 34,000 and hosted the final of the 2003 Cricket World Cup.

Golf courses
 The Royal Johannesburg & Kensington Golf Club has hosted the South African PGA Championship since 2005 and the Joburg Open since 2007
 Royal Cape Golf Club is the oldest golf club in Africa and was established in Cape Town in 1885.
 The Gary Player Country Club in Sun City hosts the annual Nedbank Golf Challenge.

Athletic stadiums
 Johannesburg stadium has a capacity of 37,500 and hosted the eighth IAAF World Cup in Athletics in 1998 and most of the 1999 All-Africa Games.

Swimming facilities
 Newton Park Swimming Pool, Gqeberha
 Kings Park Aquatic Centre, Durban
 Joan Harrison, Buffalo City
 Marina Martinique, Jeffreys Bay
 De Jong Diving Centre, Pretoria

See also 

 South Africa at the Olympics
 South Africa at the Paralympics
 South Africa at the Commonwealth Games
 Jarvis and Kaplan Cup

Notes

References

External links 
 South African Department of Sport and Recreation
 South African Sports Confederation and Olympic Committee
 Swimming South Africa
 Rustenburg SkyDiving Club
 Parachute Association of South Africa (PASA)
 SNT Sports Official Distributor of Sports equipment